Elachista ignicolor is a moth of the family Elachistidae. It is found in eastern Queensland and New South Wales, Australia.

The wingspan is 6-6.2 mm for males and 5.8-6.4 mm for females. The ground colour of the forewings varies from orange brown to mottled brown. The hindwings are dark grey.

The larvae feed on Imperata cylindrica. They mine the leaves of their host plant. Pupation takes place in cocoon consisting of straight diagonal threads.

References

Moths described in 2011
ignicolor
Moths of Australia